Facundo Placeres Busto (born 16 October 1995) is a Uruguayan footballer who plays as a midfielder.

Career statistics

Club

Notes

References

1995 births
Living people
Association football midfielders
Uruguayan footballers
Uruguayan expatriate footballers
Spanish footballers
Spanish expatriate footballers
Uruguayan Segunda División players
Club Atlético Huracán footballers
Bangor City F.C. players
Uruguayan expatriate sportspeople in Italy
Spanish expatriate sportspeople in Italy
Expatriate footballers in Italy
Uruguayan expatriate sportspeople in Wales
Spanish expatriate sportspeople in Wales
Expatriate footballers in Wales